RFV may refer to:

 Radio Free Virgin
 Radial Force Variation is a property of a tire that characterizes forces between the vehicle and the road